Maria Alekseyevna Vadeeva (born 16 July 1998) is a Russian professional basketball player for the UMMC Ekaterinburg of the Russian Premier League. Vadeeva was the 11th overall pick in the 2018 WNBA Draft. She is the first player who was born after the WNBA was founded.

Career

Europe
In 2014, Vadeeva began her professional career with Sparta&K Moscow, playing in the Russian Premier League and the EuroCup. In 2016, Vadeeva moved south and signed with Dynamo Kursk, still playing in the Premier League as well as  the EuroLeague. In the 2016–17 season, Dynamo Kursk took home the title.

WNBA
Vadeeva was drafted by the Los Angeles Sparks with the 11th overall pick in the 2018 WNBA draft. Vadeeva had some visa issues that didn't allow her to join the team right away. She played in 25 games during her rookie season.

WNBA career statistics

Regular season

|-
| align="left" | 2018
| align="left" | Los Angeles
| 25 || 0 || 8.2 || .527 || .333 || .750 || 2.2 || 0.4 || 0.4 || 0.4 || 0.5 || 3.6
|-
| align="left" | 2019
| align="left" | Los Angeles
| 15 || 1 || 12.0 || .490 || .313 || .769 || 3.9 || 0.7 || 1.0 || 0.2 || 1.2 || 7.8
|-
| align="left" | Career
| align="left" | 2 year, 1 team
| 40 || 1 || 9.6 || .506 || .321 || .760 || 2.8 || 0.5 || 0.6 || 0.4 || 0.8 || 5.2

Playoffs

|-
| align="left" | 2018
| align="left" | Los Angeles
| 1 || 0 || 3.0 || 1.000 || .000 || .000 || 0.0 || 0.0 || 0.0 || 0.0 || 0.0 || 2.0
|-
| align="left" | 2019
| align="left" | Los Angeles
| 3 || 0 || 8.3 || .100 || .000 || .000 || 2.3 || 0.7 || 0.0 || 1.0 || 0.7 || 0.7
|-
| align="left" | Career
| align="left" | 2 year, 1 team
| 4 || 0 || 7.0 || .182 || .000 || .000 || 1.8 || 0.5 || 0.0 || 0.8 || 0.5 || 1.0

National team

Youth level
Vadeeva made her international debut at the 2013 FIBA Europe Under-16 Championship in Bulgaria, where Russia placed sixth. Vadeeva once again participated, returning to the 2014 FIBA Europe Under-16 Championship in Hungary, where Russia won the title, taking home their fifth Under-16 Championship. Vadeeva was then named to the national team for the 2015 FIBA Under-19 World Championship in her home nation. Russia would remain undefeated until the final, falling to the United States and taking home silver. Vadeeva was awarded a place on the All-Tournament Team.

Senior level
Vadeeva made her senior international debut at EuroBasket Women 2015, at just the age of 16. In her debut tournament, Vadeeva averaged 12.3 points per game and 5.9 repounds per game. Vadeeva was once again named to Russia's roster, for EuroBasket Women 2017 in the Czech Republic.

References

1998 births
Living people
Basketball players from Moscow
Centers (basketball)
Los Angeles Sparks draft picks
Los Angeles Sparks players
Russian expatriate basketball people in the United States
Russian women's basketball players